Anderson Luís de Souza  (born 27 August 1977), known as Deco, is a retired professional footballer who primarily played as an attacking or central midfielder. Born and raised in Brazil, he acquired Portuguese citizenship and played for Portugal.

Deco is one of the few players to have won the UEFA Champions League with two clubs, with Porto in 2004 and Barcelona in 2006. He was named UEFA Club Footballer of the Year and UEFA Best Midfielder in Porto's Champions League-winning season and was named Man of the Match in the 2004 UEFA Champions League Final. Deco was the first player to win the UEFA Best Midfielder Award with two clubs, Porto and Barcelona. He was awarded the 2006 FIFA Club World Cup Golden Ball and the Man of the Match award in the final despite losing to Internacional.

Born and raised in Brazil, Deco received Portuguese citizenship in 2002 having completed five years of Portuguese residence, and subsequently opted to play internationally for the Portugal national team. He earned 75 caps for them, playing at two UEFA European Championships and two FIFA World Cups, reaching the final of Euro 2004, and achieving a fourth-place finish at the 2006 World Cup.

Club career

Early career
Born in São Bernardo do Campo, Deco spent time at Corinthians as a youngster, competing in the Copa São Paulo de Futebol Júnior for them. In the 1997 edition, Benfica sent Toni to scout the tournament, and he soon noticed Deco, recommending his signing. In June 1997, Benfica purchased his rights from CSA and immediately sent him on loan (along with fellow Brazilian Caju) to their farm team, Alverca. After helping them win promotion to the top tier in 1997–98 season by scoring 13 goals in 32 appearances, he returned to Benfica in July 1998. However, he left for Salgueiros in exchange for Nandinho, who went in the opposite direction. When asked by Nuno Gomes in an interview for FourFourTwo why he did not stay and become a legend at Benfica, Deco said, "Benfica decided, it wasn't my decision. They didn't want me. The coach was Graeme Souness at the time. I was young and Benfica needed some players."

At Salgueiros, Deco was plagued by injuries and only made a few appearances, until Porto purchased him in March 1999, in time to win the league title. His release from Benfica and subsequent success with Porto was considered by António Simões as an "historical mistake", while Toni stated he saw in Deco, a successor for Rui Costa the club needed since his departure.

Porto
In his first season with Porto, Deco scored a goal after just 30.08 seconds in a 1–0 away win against Molde in the 1999–2000 UEFA Champions League.

Under the guidance of manager José Mourinho in the 2002–03 season, Deco scored 10 goals in 30 matches and received 17 yellow cards and 1 red card. He was one of the key players in Porto's UEFA Cup final 3–2 win over Celtic that year. In the 2003–04 season, Deco helped Porto recapture the national title and led the team to the 2004 UEFA Champions League Final, in which Porto won 3–0 over Monaco, scoring the second goal of the match. He was the UEFA Champions League's top assist provider and also suffered the most fouls in the Champions League that season. That season, Deco also won the UEFA Club Footballer of the Year as well as the award for the best midfielder in the competition.

Barcelona

A deal was achieved between Porto and Barcelona the day after the Euro 2004 final. Barcelona agreed on a €15 million fee in cash, plus the complete rights of Ricardo Quaresma to Porto, which tagged Quaresma for €6 million. 

On 14 May 2005, Deco played in the draw against Levante, which gave Barcelona their 17th La Liga title. He also was named Barcelona's player of the season in the 2005–06 season.

Deco scored twice in the 2006 Supercopa de España, which Barça won. Deco won the UEFA Best Midfielder Award yet again for his performance in Barça's UEFA Champions League-winning season, enabling him to join the exclusive group of players that have won the same award more than once with different teams, having won the Champions League previously with Porto. He was also awarded the Golden Ball at the FIFA Club World Cup and the Man of the Match award, despite losing the final to Internacional.

Chelsea

On 30 June 2008, Chelsea signed Deco from Barcelona on a three-year contract for €10 million (£8 million). He was the first signing of new Chelsea coach Luiz Felipe Scolari, who was formerly the head coach of the Portugal national team.

Deco scored on his Chelsea debut and his Premier League debut with a 30-yard goal in a 4–0 victory over Portsmouth. Deco followed up his performance by scoring in his second game for Chelsea, a curling free-kick against Wigan Athletic. These performances led to him winning the Premier League Player of the Month award for August. Deco made his UEFA Champions League debut for Chelsea on 16 September. Deco injured himself during a training session, but he returned from the thigh injury on 19 October and came on as a substitute against Middlesbrough. He was sent off in the 3–1 defeat by Roma on 4 November 2008. He then scored a bicycle kick against Bolton Wanderers on 6 December.

Deco eventually lost his place in the 2008–09 starting line up, due in part to some poor performances, but also to the sacking of Scolari. In a June interview, Deco said, "I do not want to stay. I have not liked my experience at Chelsea." This was soon followed by Internazionale, managed by former Chelsea manager José Mourinho, declaring Inter was attempting to sign Deco along with fellow countryman Ricardo Carvalho, who had also declared his desire to leave and, like Deco, desired to link-up with Mourinho again. Both players previously played under Mourinho at Porto. However, Inter club president Massimo Moratti ruled out signing either of the Portuguese internationals on the basis of their age, telling Gazzetta dello Sport, "Deco and Carvalho? They are two champions but at this time I don't feel there's a need to buy them."

Fluminense
On 6 August 2010, Deco signed a two-year contract with Brazilian club Fluminense on a free transfer, joining former Chelsea and Barcelona teammate Juliano Belletti.

On 26 August 2013, Deco retired, ending a 17-year career. The decision came on the day before his 36th birthday. His final match was four days prior, against Goiás. Playing for Fluminense, Deco won the Campeonato Brasileiro in 2010 and 2012.

Deco also failed a drug test during his stay with Fluminense. In 2014, it was found that the result may have been due to a false positive or the contamination of the container of the urine sample. The Brazilian Football Confederation and Deco agreed to settle the case, and Deco was found not guilty of doping.

International career

Deco was never called up to the Brazil national team, as the Brazil squad for the 2002 FIFA World Cup included other attacking midfielders such as Ronaldinho, Rivaldo and Juninho. After completing six years of residence in Portugal, he was able to gain Portuguese citizenship and play for their national team. As none of his great-grandparents, grandparents or parents were Portuguese, under FIFA's player eligibility rules  his citizenship was the only factor to allow him to play for Portugal. He was subsequently mentioned several times in the media as an option for the Portugal national team.

After many months of public discussion which split Portuguese public opinion, and despite the opposition of a large number of Porto rivals' supporters, he was called up for his first international, coincidentally against Brazil. He came on as a substitute for Sérgio Conceição and scored the free-kick which won the match 2–1. This was Portugal's first win over Brazil since the 1966 FIFA World Cup. Since that match, he became a regular in the national team. Before UEFA Euro 2004, Luís Figo criticised Deco's inclusion and said, "Se você nasceu chinês, bem, você tem que jogar pela China."
(English: "If you're born Chinese, well, you have to play for China.") Deco responded, "Eu nasci no Brasil e seria uma mentira dizer que sou português agora e não brasileiro. Mas amo Portugal e adoro jogar pela seleção." (English:"I was born in Brazil and it would be a lie to say that I'm Portuguese now and not Brazilian. But I love Portugal and I love playing for the national team.")

Despite the early criticism, Deco was one of the highlights of the Portugal national team. He scored 5 goals in 75 caps for Portugal by June 2010, when his international career ended after the second-round defeat to Spain at the 2010 World Cup.

2006 World Cup
In the 2006 World Cup, Deco scored the first goal in Portugal's second Group D match against Iran in the 63rd minute prior to Cristiano Ronaldo's 80th-minute penalty. During the first knockout stage of the competition, Deco received two yellow cards in the match against the Netherlands with the first given for a rash tackle on John Heitinga, suspending him from the quarter-final win against England, as he had already picked up a caution in the match with Iran. The win against England in the quarter-final stage led to Portugal's defeat in the semi-final, which Deco was able to participate in.

Euro 2008
On 11 June, Deco scored the opening goal in Portugal's second match of Euro 2008, a Group A clash with the Czech Republic. The match ended 3–1 to Portugal, with Deco aiding his team in their passage to the quarter-finals where Portugal's campaign came to an end against Germany, the eventual runners-up of the tournament.

In February 2010, Deco announced he would be retiring from international football after the 2010 World Cup.

2010 World Cup
Deco played for Portugal in their opening game against the Ivory Coast. During the match, he was injured and was ruled out of the remaining two group matches, against North Korea and Brazil. He was fit again for the round of 16 match against Spain, but Portugal head coach Carlos Queiroz chose Tiago over him.

Deco retired from international football with 75 caps and 5 goals.

Style of play
As a player, Deco was a versatile, tactically intelligent and creative midfielder with excellent vision and technical ability. A generous and hard-working team-player capable of playing in several midfield positions. He was initially deployed as a central midfielder under manager José Mourinho during his time with Porto, although he was also capable of playing as an attacking midfielder, as a deep-lying playmaker or as a winger on either flank. While he lacked in pace as well as physical, defensive and athletic attributes, he made up for in stamina, as well as excellent ball control, dribbling skills, passing range and crossing ability, which allowed him to beat players, find space and create chances for teammates. Deco was an excellent visionary of the ball, who opened up spaces for his teammates through finding passing lanes that no one else saw, and also had a notable ability to switch the tempo of play in rapid style.

A diminutive midfielder, in later years, as he lost his acceleration, agility and mobility, he also went through a physical development, which, along with his balance, allowed him to protect the ball against larger opponents. He also contributed offensively with occasional goals due to his accurate mid-range shooting ability, and his adeptness at free-kicks. Despite his talent, Deco was also known to be injury-prone and inconsistent at times, and was also accused of drifting in and out of matches. Furthermore, his work-rate and fitness were often brought into question in his later career. Deco was also well known for his tendency to commit tactical fouls, and he was accused of diving throughout his career.

Personal life
Deco is the brother-in-law of fellow footballer Alecsandro, who plays for Coritiba Foot Ball Club, and Richarlyson. Deco is an ambassador for the Laureus Sport for Good Foundation. He also has a charitable organisation, the Deco Institute, based in the Brazilian city of Indaiatuba, near São Paulo, where he grew up.

After retiring, Deco set up D20 Sports Management, a sports agency registered in Dublin, Ireland. The agency, whose clients include Brazil international Fabinho and Burkina Faso international Edmond Tapsoba, recorded €300,000 profit in 2017.

Media
Deco features in EA Sports' FIFA football video game series. He was included in the Ultimate Team Legends in FIFA 16.

Career statistics

Club
Appearances and goals by club, season and competition.

International
Appearances and goals by national team and year

International goals

Scores and results list Portugal's goal tally first.

Honours
Porto
Primeira Divisão/Liga: 1998–99, 2002–03, 2003–04
Taça de Portugal: 1999–2000, 2000–01, 2002–03
Supertaça Cândido de Oliveira: 2001, 2003
UEFA Champions League: 2003–04
UEFA Cup: 2002–03

Barcelona
La Liga: 2004–05, 2005–06
Supercopa de España: 2005, 2006
UEFA Champions League: 2005–06

Chelsea
Premier League: 2009–10
FA Cup: 2008–09, 2009–10
FA Community Shield: 2009

Fluminense
 Campeonato Brasileiro Série A: 2010, 2012
 Campeonato Carioca: 2012

Individual
Ballon D'or Silver Ball: 2004
UEFA Club Footballer of the Year: 2003–04
UEFA Club Midfielder of the Year: 2003–04, 2005–06
2004 UEFA Champions League Final: Man of the Match
ESM Team of the Year: 2004–05
FIFA Club World Cup Golden Ball: 2006
Portuguese League Footballer of the Year: 2003–04
CNID Best Portuguese Athlete Abroad: 2006
Premier League Player of the Month: August 2008
Campeonato Carioca Best Player: 2012
Campeonato Carioca Best Midfielder: 2012
Globe Soccer Awards Player Career Award: 2013
Golden Foot: 2016, as football legend

Orders
 Medal of Merit, Order of the Immaculate Conception of Vila Viçosa (House of Braganza)

References

External links

goal.com

1977 births
Living people
People from São Bernardo do Campo
Brazilian footballers
Portuguese footballers
Association football midfielders
Nacional Atlético Clube (SP) players
Sport Club Corinthians Paulista players
Centro Sportivo Alagoano players
S.L. Benfica footballers
F.C. Alverca players
S.C. Salgueiros players
FC Porto players
FC Barcelona players
Chelsea F.C. players
Fluminense FC players
Campeonato Brasileiro Série A players
Liga Portugal 2 players
Primeira Liga players
La Liga players
Premier League players
UEFA Champions League winning players
UEFA Men's Player of the Year Award winners
UEFA Cup winning players
Portugal international footballers
UEFA Euro 2004 players
2006 FIFA World Cup players
UEFA Euro 2008 players
2010 FIFA World Cup players
Brazilian expatriate footballers
Brazilian expatriate sportspeople in Spain
Brazilian expatriate sportspeople in England
Portuguese expatriate footballers
Portuguese expatriate sportspeople in Spain
Portuguese expatriate sportspeople in England
Expatriate footballers in Spain
Expatriate footballers in England
Brazilian emigrants to Portugal
Naturalised citizens of Portugal
Footballers from São Paulo (state)